Goddards is a large country house in Abinger Common, Surrey, England.

The house was designed by Edwin Lutyens in 1898–1900 and later enlarged. It was built "as a Home of Rest to which ladies of small means might repair for holiday" for shipping magnate Frederick Mirrielees. In 1910 Lutyens extended the building and adapted it as a private residence for Mrs D. Mirrielees.

It has an integrated skittle alley and the gardens were designed by Gertrude Jekyll.

In 1991 Bill Hall bequeathed Goddards to the Lutyens Trust in memory of his architect son, Lee Hall, who died in 1988. The property is now leased by the Landmark Trust and is available for holiday lets. It is a Grade II* listed building. The architecture writer Alan Powers considers it one of three houses that exemplify the English Arts and Crafts movement. It is the headquarters of the Lutyens Trust. Tours are available by prior arrangement.

See also
Abinger Common War Memorial, also designed by Lutyens in the same village
Grade II* listed buildings in Mole Valley

References

External links

Goddards from the Landmark Trust
Goddards
The Lutyens Trust

Grade II* listed buildings in Surrey
Grade II* listed houses
Country houses in Surrey
Landmark Trust properties in England
Works of Edwin Lutyens in England
Gardens in Surrey
Gardens by Gertrude Jekyll